Hans Schultz may refer to:

 Hans Schultz (sport shooter) (1864–1937)
 Sgt. Hans Schultz, a character from the American television series Hogan's Heroes

See also
 Hans Schulz (1939–2012), German sprinter
 Hans Schulze (1911–1992), German water polo player